The 2009–10 EHF Champions League was the 50th edition of Europe's premier club handball tournament and the seventeenth edition under the current EHF Champions League format. It was also the first edition under the new qualifying format. Ciudad Real were the defending champions. The final was played on 30 May 2010, at the Lanxess Arena, home ground of VfL Gummersbach and Kölner Haie, in Cologne, Germany.

Draw
The draw for the group stage took place at the Liechtenstein Museum in Vienna on 24 June 2009. A total of 24 teams were drawn into four groups of six. Teams were divided into four pots, based on EHF coefficients. Clubs from the same pot or the same association cannot be drawn into the same group.

Each team played against each other in its group twice. The top two in each group proceeded to the knockout stage, and the third-placed teams entered the EHF Cup's Winners Cup Round of 32.

Qualification stage

Groups 

Group 1 HC Vardar Skopje  HC Dinamo Minsk  Besiktas JK  RK Budućnost Podgorica    

Group 2 STR Saporischschja  A.C. PAOK  SPE Strovolos    

Group 3 Fyllingen Handball  A1 Bregenz  RK Partizan Si&Si    

Group 4 Tatran Prešov  Vive Targi Kielce  FC Porto Vitalis     
|-

Group 5 CB Ademar León  TBV Lemgo  Celje  Kadetten Schaffhausen

Group 1

Group 2

Group 3

Group 4

Group 5

Group stage

Groups

Group A Chekhovskiye Medvedi  Montpellier HB  SC Pick Szeged  BM Valladolid  HCM Constanța  A.C. PAOK 

Group B MKB Veszprém  Gorenje  Chambéry Savoie  Rhein-Neckar Löwen RK Bosna Sarajevo  Vive Targi Kielce

Group C BM Ciudad Real  HC Croatia Zagreb  HSV Hamburg  FCK Handbold  Alingsas HK  Fyllingen Handball 

Group D THW Kiel  KIF Kolding  FC Barcelona  Ademar León  ZMC Amicitia Zürich  HC Vardar Skopje

Group A

Group B

Group C

Group D

Knockout stage

1/8 Final 

The Last 16 fixtures of the 2009–10 EHF Men's Champions League were drawn in the EHF Headquarters on 9 March 2010.  The four group winners were drawn against the teams ranked fourth in the Group Phase. The second ranked teams will meet teams ranked third.

1/4 Final 

The Quarterfinals of the EHF Men's Champions League were drawn in the EHF Headquarters on 6 April 2010.

Semifinals

3/4 Match

Final

Top scorers 

Source:

References

External links 
 EHF Champions League website

 
EHF Champions League seasons
C
C